John Burton may refer to:

Religion
John Burton (archdeacon of Cleveland) (fl. 1685–1700), Anglican priest
John Burton (minister) (1760–1838), Nova Scotia Baptist minister
John Burton (provost) (fl. 1871–1885), Episcopalian Provost of St Ninian's Cathedral, Perth

Sports
John Burton (canoeist) (born 1947), American slalom canoer
John Burton (footballer, born 1863) (1863–1914), English footballer with Aston Villa
John Burton (footballer, born 1875) (1875–1949), English footballer with Derby County, Tottenham, Preston North End, West Ham.
John Burton (footballer, born 1885) (1885–1938), English footballer with West Ham United, Birmingham and Cardiff City
John Burton (golfer) (1903–1973), English golfer
John Burton (Kent cricketer) (1837–1887)
John Burton (sportsman) (1925–2010), New Zealand cricketer and rugby union player
John C. Burton (1923–2014), American cross country skier

Politics
John Burton (fl. 1376–1390) (died by 1395), MP for Nottinghamshire
John Burton (fl. 1401), MP for Nottinghamshire
John Burton (fl. 1407), MP for Huntingdonshire
John Burton (American politician) (born 1932), American congressman, California State Senator, and California Democratic Party Chairman
John Burton (Canadian politician) (born 1927), Canadian member of parliament
John Burton (mayor) (c. 1911–1992), American politician who served as mayor of Ypsilanti, Michigan
John Burton (MP for Bristol) (died 1455), MP for Bristol
John Burton (political agent), former constituency agent of British Prime Minister Tony Blair
John T. Burton (died 1880), newspaper publisher and politician in Newfoundland

Others
John Burton (actor), British stage and television actor
John Burton (antiquary) (1710–1771), English antiquary and physician
John Burton (conservationist), co-founder of the nonprofit environmental organization World Land Trust
John Burton (diplomat) (John Wear Burton, 1915–2010), Australian public servant, diplomat and academic
John Burton (scholar) (1696–1771), English theological and classical scholar
John Bloundelle-Burton (1850–1917), English novelist
John H. Burton, American architect
John Hill Burton (1809–1881), Scottish historian, jurist, economist and Historiographer Royal
John W. Burton (film producer) (1906–1978), American animation cinematographer and producer

See also 
Jon Burton, video game designer
Jonathan Burton (disambiguation)
Jack Burton (disambiguation)